Bystry was one of 29 s (officially known as Project 7) built for the Soviet Navy during the late 1930s. Completed in 1939, she was assigned to the Black Sea Fleet. When the German invasion of the Soviet Union (Operation Barbarossa) began in June 1941, the ship was  under repair. Bystry struck a mine and sank in July. Her wreck was raised, but was too badly damaged for immediate repairs. She was later sunk by German bombs and her wreck had the bow salvaged to repair one of her sisters.

Design and description
Having decided to build the large and expensive   destroyer leaders, the Soviet Navy sought Italian assistance in designing smaller and cheaper destroyers.

Their crew numbered 197 officers and sailors in peacetime and 236 in wartime. The designers had been conservative in rating the turbines and many, but not all, of the ships handily exceeded their designed speed during their sea trials. Others fell considerably short of it, although specific figures for most individual ships have not survived.

As built, the Gnevny-class ships mounted four  B-13 guns in two pairs of superfiring single mounts fore and aft of the superstructure. Anti-aircraft defense was provided by a pair of  34-K AA guns in single mounts and a pair of  21-K AA guns as well as two  DK or DShK machine guns. They carried six  torpedo tubes in two rotating triple mounts; each tube was provided with a reload. The ships could also carry a maximum of either 60 or 95 mines and 25 depth charges. The ships were equipped with two K-1 paravanes intended to destroy mines and a pair of depth-charge throwers.

Construction and service 
Built in Nikolayev's Shipyard No. 198 (Andre Marti (South)) as yard number 320, Bystry was laid down on 17 April 1936 and launched on 5 November 1936. The ship was completed on 27 January 1939 and was commissioned into the Black Sea Fleet on 7 March. When Operation Barbarossa, the German invasion of the Soviet Union, began on 22 June 1941, Bystry was assigned to the 2nd Destroyer Division and was awaiting a scheduled refit in Sevastopol. On 1 July, she departed for Nikolayev for further work, but struck a mine while leaving Sevastopol, killing 24 and wounding 81 crewmen. The explosion flooded the forward half of the ship as well as the boiler rooms and her bow grounded in shallow water. Bystry was refloated on 13 July and drydocked the following day for repairs. She was in very poor condition and her hull was patched to move her out of the drydock pending a final decision on whether to repair her. The ship was struck by several bombs during a German airstrike in September and sank. Her guns were removed 20 November – 15 December and used to reinforce the coastal defenses of Sevastopol. Her bow was later salvaged to repair her sister .

Citations

Sources

Further reading
 

Gnevny-class destroyers
1936 ships
Ships built at the Black Sea Shipyard